The 1994 Bausch & Lomb Championships was a women's tennis tournament played on outdoor clay courts at the Amelia Island Plantation on Amelia Island, Florida in the United States that was part of Tier II of the 1994 WTA Tour. It was the 15th edition of the tournament and was held from April 4 through April 10, 1994. Arantxa Sánchez Vicario won the singles title.

Finals

Singles

 Arantxa Sánchez Vicario defeated  Gabriela Sabatini 6–1, 6–4
 It was Sánchez Vicario's 1st title of the year and the 13th of her career.

Doubles

 Arantxa Sánchez Vicario /  Larisa Savchenko defeated  Amanda Coetzer /  Inés Gorrochategui 6–2, 6–7, 6–4
 It was Sánchez Vicario's 5th title of the year and the 43rd of her career. It was Savchenko's 3rd title of the year and the 48th of her career.

External links
 ITF tournament edition details 

Bausch and Lomb Championships
Amelia Island Championships
Bausch & Lomb Championships
Bausch & Lomb Championships
Bausch & Lomb Championships